Cosmo's Midnight are an Australian electronic music duo formed in 2012 in Sydney, New South Wales. The duo consists of twin brothers, Cosmo and Patrick Liney. Their debut studio album, What Comes Next (2018), peaked at number 36 on the ARIA Albums Chart.

Artistry

Musical instruments and sound
Cosmo's Midnight are best known for their use of the vibraslap, a percussive instrument. AllMusic's Marcy Donelson described their music as having "bright keyboard timbres and idiosyncratic beats" and stated that they typically collaborate with acts "from the pop, indie electronica, rap, and EDM realms."

Musical style and influences
Cosmo's Midnight cite Daft Punk, Chic, Nile Rodgers and West Coast rap as musical influences.

History
Cosmo's Midnight were formed by twin brothers, Cosmo and Patrick Liney, as a music duo in Sydney in 2012 after graduating from Waverley College. They provide different styles within electronic music often with pop and R&B elements. Their tracks have been included in several compilation albums such as the 2015 Ministry of Sound FUT.UR.ISM 3.0 and Chillout Sessions XVIII. Tracks have also been presented on radio stations such as Triple J, FBi Radio, BBC Radio 1, and KEXP. They were signed to Astral People management after winning a Future Classic remix contest for Flume's "Sleepless" in 2012.

Cosmo's Midnight released their debut single, "Phantasm" featuring Nicole Millar, followed by their debut extended play, Surge, on indie label, Yes Please, in mid-2013. They remixed other artists including Panama, Indian Summer, Anna Lunoe and AlunaGeorge before signing to Sony Music Australia in 2014. Cosmo's Midnight released singles "Snare" featuring Wild Eyed Boy and "Walk with Me" featuring Kučka as well as their second EP, Moments, in 2015.

They undertook their first tour of North America early in 2017, and followed in August with their next single, "Mind Off" featuring Kudu Blue. The duo released their debut album, What Comes Next, in June 2018, which peaked at No. 36 on the ARIA Albums Chart.

In the lead up to the release of their sophomore album, the duo released a string of singles with features by Ruel, Age.Sex.Location, and Matthew Young. Yesteryear was released in October 2020.

On 20 August 2021, Cosmo's Midnight released their first single of 2021, saying "'Titanic' kind of feels like a thematic progression from Yesteryear. It's reflecting on past regrets but instead of Yesteryear where it's kind of got this hint of optimism to it, 'Titanic' is kind of pessimistic. It's like the moment just before everything spirals downwards."

Discography

Studio albums

Extended plays

Singles

Remixes

Awards and nominations

ARIA Music Awards
The ARIA Music Awards is an annual ceremony presented by Australian Recording Industry Association (ARIA), which recognise excellence, innovation, and achievement across all genres of the music of Australia. They commenced in 1987.

! 
|-
! scope="row"| 2021
| Yesteryear
| Best Dance Release
| 
| 
|}

References

External links
 
 

Australian electronic musicians
Australian DJs
DJs from Sydney
Electronic dance music DJs
Living people
Year of birth missing (living people)